Legislative elections were held in Bolivia in May 1916 to elect half the seats of the Chamber Deputies and one-third of the Senate.

Results

Elected members
The new senators were: 
Zenón C. Orias, PL (Chuquisaca)
Germán Zegarra, PL (Cochabamba)
César M. Ochávez, PL (Cochabamba)
Julio Zamora, PL (Oruro)
Atiliano Aparicio, PL (Oruro)

References

Elections in Bolivia
Bolivia
Legislative election
May 1916 events
Election and referendum articles with incomplete results